Yuto Shirai (白井 裕人, born June 19, 1988) is a Japanese football player for Zweigen Kanazawa.

Club statistics
Updated to end of 2018 season.

References

External links
Profile at Zweigen Kanazawa

1988 births
Living people
People from Kashiwa
Ryutsu Keizai University alumni
Association football people from Chiba Prefecture
Japanese footballers
J1 League players
J2 League players
Matsumoto Yamaga FC players
Zweigen Kanazawa players
Association football goalkeepers